The Manicoré Biological Reserve is a biological reserve in the state of Amazonas, Brazil.
It fully protects an intact area of the Amazon rainforest that is rich in biodiversity, and serves as part of a shield against the advance of the arc of deforestation.

Location

The Manicoré Biological Reserve is the municipalities of Manicoré (54.92%) and Novo Aripuanã (45.08%) in the state of Amazonas.
It is north of the Trans-Amazonian Highway (BR-230).
It is bounded by the Campos de Manicoré Environmental Protection Area (APA)  to the west and by the Aripuanã National Forest to the south and east.
Both of these units were created at the same time as the Manicoré Biological Reserve.
It lies to the west of the Aripuanã River, a tributary of the Madeira River. The Madeira flows some distance to the west of the reserve.
The Manicoré River forms part of the boundary with the Campos de Manicoré APA, then flows north through the Manicoré Biological Reserve.

Environment

The reserve is in the Amazon biome.
Vegetation is mainly dense rainforest with some pioneer formations, and has not suffered as much deforestation as other areas of the Amazon.
The reserve holds a wide range of palm tree species, and has endangered tree species such as the Bertholletia excelsa, Amburana cearensis var. Acreana, Swietenia macrophylla and Aniba rosaeodora.
The region has a variety of environments and diverse fauna, although there have been few studies.
The Madeira River basin is estimated to harbour about 800 species of birds, and is an area with many primates including endemic species.

History

The Manicoré Biological Reserve was created by presidential decree on 11 May 2016.
It is administered by the Chico Mendes Institute for Biodiversity Conservation (ICMBio).
The reserve was created to protect the biological diversity of the Manicoré, Manicorezinho and Jatuarana rivers, their tributaries and the associated natural and physical landscapes, with the purpose of sustaining ecosystem services and contributing to the environmental stability of the region.
The soils are acidic and low fertility, so unsuitable for agriculture or grazing, but the region has been feeling growing pressure from loggers, ranchers and soybean farmers since 2005. 
The reserve is part of a shield designed to protect the heart of the Amazon forest from the advance of deforestation.

The reserve is one of five conservation units created in the last week before the provisional removal of president Dilma Rousseff, totalling , all in the south of Amazonas state.

Her administration had also reduced the area of seven protected areas in the Amazon to allow for construction of dams on the Tapajós.

Notes

Sources

2016 establishments in Brazil
Biological reserves of Brazil
Protected areas of Amazonas (Brazilian state)
Protected areas established in 2016